A-Studio, stylized as a'studio, is a Russian-based Kazakhstani pop music group originally consisting of  Baigali Serkebayev (keyboard), Vladimir Mikloshich (bass), Baglan Sadvakasov (solo guitar) and frontman Batyrkhan Shukenov (vocal and sax). The band was created in 1982 in Almaty, then called Alma-Ata, hence called "Alma-Ata Studio". Later, the name was changed to "A-Studio". Currently the group's members are Georgian frontwoman Keti Topuria, Baigali Serkebayev and Vladimir Mikloshich.

In 1989, the A-Studio song "Julia" ("Джулия") caught the attention of Russian singers Philipp Kirkorov and Alla Pugacheva. Pugacheva invited them to her annual "Christmas Meeting" in 1990 and introduced them as the best band in the country (at that time, the USSR). The song, as well as the band, immediately became popular across the USSR.

In 2000, Shukenov left the band to pursue a solo career, while A-Studio introduced a  new vocalist, Polina Griffith. The band released several singles of songs with Griffith on vocals, including "S.O.S", which reached #64 on the UK Singles Chart and gained popularity in Europe and the USA.

In August 2004, Griffith left the band to pursue solo work. As a result, a new vocalist, Keti Topuria, originally from Tbilisi, Georgia, joined A-Studio. Together, they released popularly acclaimed singles such as "Uletayu" ("Flying Away"), "Ty" ("You"), "Noch'-Podruga" ("Night-Friend"). "Uletayu" hit the charts across the former Soviet Union, bringing the band a new wave of popularity. However, this successful new beginning was clouded by the death of Baglan Sadvakasov on 2 August 2006 as the result of a car accident. His place in the band was taken by his son, 17-year-old Tamerlan Sadvakasov. Later, as the younger Sadvakasov left the band to pursue education, Fedor "Federico" Dossumov became the solo-guitarist for A-Studio.
At different times during the late 1990s, A-Studio worked with Greg Walsh, famous UK sound-producer.
Since 1988, A-Studio has released 14 albums, including 10 studio albums, 3 live albums and 1 compilation album. These include:
 
 "Put' Bez Ostanovok" (Путь Без Остановок, Road Without Stops, 1988)
 "Dzhuliya" (Джулия, Julia, 1990)
 "A-Studio" (А-Студио, 1993)
 "Soldat Lyubvi" (Солдат Любви, Soldier of Love, 1994)
 "A-Studio Live" (1995)
 "Nelyubimaya" (Нелюбимая, Unloved, 1996)
 "The Best" (1997)
 "Greshnaya Strast'" (Грешная Страсть, Sinful Passion, 1998)
 "Takie Dela" (Такие Дела, This Is It, 2001)
 "Uletayu" (Улетаю, Flying Away, 2005)
 "905" (2007)
 "Total" (2008)
 "Volny" (Волны, Waves, 2010)
 "Koncert v Kremle 25 let" (Концерт в Кремле 25 лет, Concert in Kremlin 25 years, 2015)

Their single, "Fashion Girl", was released in mid-2010 and is included in the album "Volny". It achieved modest popularity in Russia and former Soviet Union countries. The music video shot for the song was finished on November 8, 2010, according to their official website. In the video, the members of the group are trying to construct a female robot in a laboratory, set in a 1960s-1970s setting. The director of the clip is German Glinski, a Ukrainian video designer. The single reached No. 23 on the Russian singles chart.

Their latest music video, "Tik-Tak" was released in 2018.

References

External links

 Official site
 YouTube channel
 Instagram

Russian pop music groups
Kazakhstani pop musicians
Russian National Music Award winners 

Winners of the Golden Gramophone Award